Capriglio is a comune (municipality) in the Province of Asti in the Italian region Piedmont, located about  southeast of Turin and about  northwest of Asti.

coordinates = 

coordinates = 

coordinates = 

Capriglio borders the following municipalities: Buttigliera d'Asti, Castelnuovo Don Bosco, Cerreto d'Asti, Montafia, Passerano Marmorito, and Piovà Massaia

References

Cities and towns in Piedmont